Love Buffet is a 2010 Taiwanese television series based on the shōjo manga , written by Nagamu Nanaji. It stars Reen Yu, Aaron Yan and Calvin Chen. The two male leads were members of boy band Fahrenheit, which performed the opening and ending themes.

It was first broadcast in Taiwan on free-to-air Formosa Television (FTV, CH6 民視) on Sunday evenings from December 19, 2010, to March 13, 2011, and was repeated the following Saturday on cable TV Gala Television (GTV) Variety Show/CH 28 (八大綜合台). This show was also broadcast in Singapore and Malaysia.

Plot
Xiao Feng is a lively girl starting her first year of university when her life is turned upside-down by the arrival of her new upstairs neighbors: cousins Cheng Yi and Da Ye. Their arrival becomes much talked about at the university.

Xiao Feng starts to get along with Da Ye, and falls in love with him. However, Da Ye doesn't have any feelings for Xiao Feng as he treats every girl the same way, although Xiao Feng sometimes feels that she is given preferential treatment. During this period, Yi Cheng starts to develop romantic feeling for Xiao Feng.

Xiao Feng confesses her feelings to Da Ye, who rejects her by saying that he doesn't know the true meaning of "love". Xiao Feng becomes heartbroken and depressed.

Yi Cheng pursues Xiao Feng and they become closer, making Da Ye uneasy. Just when Yi Cheng and Xiao Feng are about to become a couple, one of Yi Cheng's previous romantic interests demands his attention – they talk things through and free themselves of each other. However, Xiao Feng misreads the situation and is heartbroken again. Da Ye begins to fall for Xiao Feng, and Xiao Feng begins dating him in an effort to forget about Yi Cheng.

Yi Cheng continues to pursue Xiao Feng despite her being in a relationship with Da Ye. In class, Yi Cheng and Xiao Feng accidentally kiss, however Xiao Feng tells Yi Cheng that she hated the kiss. Yi Cheng later confesses his feelings to Xiao Feng, while Da Ye becomes increasingly jealous.

Without telling Yi Cheng, Da Ye and Xiao Feng go on a two-day trip. Upon returning, Yi Cheng embraces Xiao Feng and tries to kiss her, but she pushes him away. Xian Feng tells Da Ye about this and Da Ye reacts by punching Yi Cheng.

The cousins learn that one of them must return to Shanghai to assist a new family business. Yi Cheng wants to ruin Da Ye and Xiao Feng's next date, but hesitates as he does not want to hurt Xiao Feng. Da Ye breaks up with Xiao Feng, hating his jealousy as he falls further in love with her, and decides to go to Shanghai.

Yi Cheng asks Xiao Feng if she would rather he left. She tells him that he should decide his future on his own. Yi Cheng confesses his feelings to Xiao Feng one last time and she rejects him, saying "I can't carry such a heavy burden."

Cast

Xing family

Hu family

Others

Guest star

Music

Opening theme
 Song Title: "Guardian Star" (守護星)
 Lyricist: 陳信延
 Composer: JerryC, 郭偉聰
 Singer: Fahrenheit (飛輪海)

Ending theme
 Song Title: "Mistake" (誤會)
 Lyricist: 藍小邪
 Composer: JerryC、楊子朴
 Singer: Fahrenheit (飛輪海)

Insert songs
 Song Title: "Exit" (出口)
 Lyricist: Shu Chen (東城衛 脩)
 Composer: Shu Chen
 Singer: Dong Cheng Wei (東城衛)
 Song Title: "Two In The Rain" (雨の中の二人)
 Composer: 利根一郎

Ratings

 Rival dramas on air at the same time: Channel-X, Four Gifts, Sunny Happiness and Gossip Girl.
 Source: China Times

Publications

Love Buffet Pictorial Book

 Publisher: TTV Cultural Enterprise Ltd. (台视文化事业股份有限公司)
 Release date: 17 December 2010

International broadcast

 Singapore: StarHub TV and E City (CH825) from 1 January 2011 on Saturdays at 1100 and 1900; and E City [+2] (CH826) at 1300 and 2100
 Malaysia: Astro Shuang Xing 雙星 (CH324) from 13 April 2011 at weekdays and Saturdays on 2230 and 1330
 Thailand : ThaiTV3 (CH3) from 3 November 2012 on Saturday 01.35–04.00 and Sunday 02.00–03.25

References

External links
  FTV's Love Buffet official page
  Love Buffet GTV official page
  Love Buffet official Facebook page
  Love Buffet official YAM blog
  Love Buffet at Fahrenheit Globa1

Formosa Television original programming
Gala Television original programming
2010 Taiwanese television series debuts
2011 Taiwanese television series endings
Taiwanese television dramas based on manga